Ammonite is the twenty first album by the Japanese rock group Plastic Tree.

Track listing

Plastic Tree albums
2011 albums